Pheidole is a genus of ants that belongs to the ant subfamily Myrmicinae. The genus is widespread and ecologically dominant. It probably includes more than 1000 species.  The genus first evolved in the Americas, eventually spreading across the globe.

Colony structure
Most species of Pheidole are dimorphic, which means that colonies contain two castes of workers, the "minor" workers, and the "major" workers, or "soldiers". The latter generally have much larger heads and mandibles in comparison to their usually fairly modest body size.

In addition, as in other ant species, a colony may contain one or several queens, and also in mature colonies, alates - virgin winged females and males.

Major workers
The distinctive major workers have earned the genus Pheidole the nickname of "big-headed ants". The major workers of a Pheidole colony, while they may look fierce, are often quite shy and are often the first to flee on any hint of danger. Many Pheidole species are the prey of parasitoid phorid flies that lay their eggs on the major workers; the fly larvae grow mainly in the head capsules of the victims, eventually decapitating them, and probably would starve in the bodies of minor workers.

In most cases, the major workers are employed within the nest to break up large food items, or outside to carry large items, such as seeds; many Pheidole species are ecologically important seed consumers ("harvesters").

Species list

The genus contains over 1,000 species. They include:

 Pheidole acutidens
 Pheidole argentina
 Pheidole barreleti
 Pheidole bicarinata
 Pheidole bigote
 Pheidole branstetteri
 Pheidole braueri
 Pheidole bula
 Pheidole carinote
 Pheidole cervicornis
 Pheidole ceylonica
 Pheidole clavata
 Pheidole debilis
 Pheidole decepticon
 Pheidole dentata
 Pheidole diffidens
 Pheidole dodo
 Pheidole elecebra
 Pheidole elongicephala
 Pheidole eowilsoni
 Pheidole epiphyta
 Pheidole fervens
 Pheidole fossimandibula
 Pheidole gracilipes
 Pheidole gymnoceras
 Pheidole harlequina
 Pheidole harrisonfordi
 Pheidole horni
 Pheidole inquilina
 Pheidole janzeni
 Pheidole jonas
 Pheidole karolmorae
 Pheidole karolsetosa
 Pheidole komori
 Pheidole laevithorax
 Pheidole lagunculinoda
 Pheidole lanuginosa
 Pheidole latinoda 
 Pheidole leoncortesi
 Pheidole loki
 Pheidole malinsii
 Pheidole megacephala
 Pheidole megatron
 Pheidole microgyna
 Pheidole neokohli
 Pheidole nietneri
 Pheidole noda
 Pheidole obtusospinosa
 Pheidole ochracea Pheidole oculata Pheidole pallidula Pheidole pararugiceps Pheidole parasitica Pheidole parva Pheidole pegasus Pheidole phanigaster Pheidole picobarva Pheidole pronotalis Pheidole psilogaster Pheidole purpurea Pheidole ragnax Pheidole rhinomontana Pheidole rugithorax Pheidole rugosa Pheidole sebofila Pheidole simplispinosa Pheidole spathifera 
 Pheidole sulcaticeps 
 Pheidole symbiotica Pheidole templaria 
 Pheidole teneriffana Pheidole uncagena Pheidole vieti Pheidole vulcan Pheidole xerophila''

References

External links 

Myrmecos.net images of live Pheidole
gallery of Pheidole specimen images, on Antweb.org

 
Myrmicinae
Ant genera